The Royal Air Force and United States Army Air Forces dropped 2.7 million tons of bombs on Europe during World War II. In the United Kingdom, the German Luftwaffe dropped more than 12,000 metric tons of bombs on London alone. In 2018, the British Ministry of Defence reported that 450 World War II bombs were made safe or defused since 2010 by disposal teams. Every year, an estimated 2,000 tons of World War II munitions are found in Germany, at times requiring the evacuation of tens of thousands of residents from their homes. In Berlin alone, 1.8 million pieces of ordnance have been defused between 1947 and 2018. Buried bombs, as well as mortars, land mines and grenades, are often found during construction work or other excavations, or by farmers tilling the land.

Belgium 

 February 2020: Hundreds of people were evacuated after construction workers discovered a World War II bomb in Maasmechelen, Limburg.

Great Britain 

 1 October 1969: A German parachute mine was defused by a team led by Major George R. Fletcher MBE, Royal Engineers. at Burghley Road, Camden.
5 March 2010: A  unexploded German bomb was found in Southampton and was blown up in a controlled explosion by the Royal Navy.
11 August 2015: A  German bomb was found and defused by British Army experts in East London.
12 May 2016: 1,100 properties were advised to evacuate and three primary schools were closed after a  German bomb was found under a school playground in Bath, with the bomb being safely deactivated the following day.
 2 March 2017: A  German bomb was found and defused by a British Army disposal team in Brent, north-west London.
16 May 2017: A  German bomb was found at Aston Expressway, near Birmingham, and destroyed by British Army experts with a controlled explosion. Hundreds of homes were evacuated and businesses were closed, and London Midland rail services suspended. Two buildings were damaged by the blast.
29 November 2017:  A  German ‘G’ parachute mine was discovered offshore at Falmouth and was detonated safely.
14 February 2018: A  German bomb, found during works in King George V Dock, near London City Airport, was removed from the area and detonated at sea off Shoeburyness, Essex, by British Army experts.
24 May 2019: 1,500 houses were evacuated at Kingston upon Thames after a German bomb was found and defused by a controlled explosion by a disposal team. The blast shattered windows along Fasset Road.
3 February 2020: A number of streets were evacuated in Central London when a  A World War II bomb was found in the district of Soho.
1 December 2020: Royal Navy experts were called after the discovery of a World War II German submarine-laid, moored influence, mine in the River Clyde, Scotland, which contained  of explosives and a controlled explosion to dispose of the mine was carried out.
15 December 2020: A 42-foot trawler, the Galwad-Y-Mor, was utterly damaged and disabled by the explosion of what could be, according to the experts, WWII  discarded ordnance off Cromer, Norfolk. The wheelhouse was completely wrecked by the shock wave, and the captain and the rest of the seven men crew, two Britons and five Latvians, were injured, some of them suffering "life-changing" wounds. The trawler, low in the water but still afloat, was towed by the tug GPS Avenger to Grimsby where she was laid up to assess damage; the crew had been already rescued by the offshore support vessel Esvagt Njord. 
26 February 2021: 2,600 households and the University of Exeter halls of residence were evacuated after the discovery of an unexploded  World War II German bomb in Exeter and a controlled detonation was carried out. Despite precautions, houses within 100m were damaged, a large crater was formed, and debris was thrown 250m away.
22 July 2021: Eight homes were evacuated and a section of the M62 motorway was closed after the discovery of a  World War II bomb on a new housing development in Goole.
3 December 2021: Train services were delayed after the discovery of an unexploded World War II bomb in Netley, Hampshire at a construction site near a railway track.
8 June 2022: After a suspected wartime bomb is found in a lake in Mossley Hill in Liverpool, a planned detonation is successfully carried out.
26 January 2023: A planned detonation of a wartime bomb found on a beach in Essex occurs.
10 February 2023: A World War II bomb exploded in Great Yarmouth during attempts to defuse it. Minor damage and no injuries were reported.

Germany
 September 1994: A bomb exploded on a building site in Friedrichshain, Berlin, damaging many houses and killing three people.
 June 2010: 7,000 people were evacuated in Göttingen after a  bomb was found. Three members of the bomb-disposal unit died after the bomb exploded.

 January 2014: A construction worker in Euskirchen was killed and two critically wounded after hitting a buried bomb with an excavator.
 September 2017: A bomb dropped by the USAAF during World War II led to the evacuation of 21,000 people in Koblenz.
 September 2017: 70,000 people had to leave their homes in Frankfurt after a British bomb was discovered.
 April 2018: A  bomb found in Paderborn forced the evacuation of 26,000 people.
 April 2018: 12,000 people were evacuated in Berlin after a bomb was discovered just north of Berlin Hauptbahnhof.
 August 2018: the discovery of a World War II bomb required the evacuation of 18,500 people in Ludwigshafen.
 April 2019: 600 people were evacuated when a bomb was discovered in Frankfurt's River Main. Divers with the city's fire service were participating in a routine training exercise when they found the  device.
 July 2019: 16,500 people evacuated in Frankfurt when a   bomb was found during construction.
January 2020: Two  World War II bombs were found in Dortmund forcing the evacuation of 14,000 residents and the closure of the city's main train station.
April 2020: A discovery of a  World War II bomb in Bonn was successfully defused but caused the evacuation of 1,200 residents and 200 patients at a local hospital, including 11 people critically-ill with coronavirus.
October 2020: 10,000 office workers were evacuated, along with 15 residents in Neukölln, Berlin when a  World War II bomb was discovered.
January 2021: Over 8,000 people were evacuated in Göttingen after the discovery of four World War II bombs were discovered in the city centre.
May 2021: 16,500 people were evacuated when a bomb was discovered in Flensburg. Construction workers were excavating nearby when they found the  device.
May 2021: Around 25,000 people were evacuated in Frankfurt after the discovery of a  unexploded bomb.
October 2021: 2,000 people evacuated in Munich after the discovery of a  unexploded aerial bomb.
December 2021: Four people were injured during the construction of Trunk Line 2 after a  bomb exploded in Munich.
December 2021: 15,000 people were evacuated in Berlin after the discovery of a  unexploded aerial bomb.
August 2022: 12,000 people were evacuated in Berlin after the discovery of a  unexploded bomb in Friedrichshain.
September 2022: A  unexploded bomb was found during construction at a community garden southeast of Berlin's A115 autobahn.
March 2023: A  unexploded bomb was found during construction in Berlin’s Zehlendorf district.

Italy
 October 2016: 1,300 people were evacuated in Rovereto after the discovery of a  American bomb; less than one year earlier, a  bomb was found in the same town.
 March 2018: 23,000 people were evacuated in Fano after a British-made bomb was discovered.
 July 2018: 12,000 were forced from their homes after a  bomb was discovered in Terni.
October 2019: 4,000 people were evacuated and a nearby highway was closed after a discovery of a World War II bomb in Bolzano, which was removed and blown up in controlled explosion.
 December 2019: 10,000 people were evacuated in Turin upon the discovery of a  British bomb; Mayor Chiara Appendino reported that the device was defused by the Italian Army.
 December 2019: 54,000 people were evacuated in Brindisi from a radius of  after the discovery of a World War II bomb.
November 2020: The Italian army was called to AS Roma training ground after the discovery of as many as 20 devices were found underneath the turf during work to build new pitches at their training complex.
 August 2022: During the 2022 European heat waves, a dried-up river bank of the River Po revealed an unexploded World War II bomb. The bomb was subsequently disposed of through a planned detonation.

Poland 

 October 2020: Around 750 people were evacuated in the port city of Świnoujście after the largest ever unexploded World War II bomb in Poland, a Tallboy bomb, was discovered in the Baltic Sea shipping canal, with the bomb detonating during the defusing process.

Slovenia 
Areas with highest concentrations of unexploded ordinances from second world war is in Žužemberk and in Tezno, Maribor because of former airplane motor factory.

 30 June 2005: A 500 kg bomb was found in Vodole, Maribor. Bomb was relocated and detonated on same day, Slovenian Police evacuated nearest two houses.
 10 May 2008: A 100 kg bomb was found in Nova Gorica.
 14 July 2011: A 250 kg bomb was found on construction site in Dravograd. Bomb was disarmed on same day and disposed day after.
 3 October 2011: A 250 kg bomb was found on same construction site in Dravograd. Bomb was disposed of on 4 October.
 June 2014: A 250 kg bomb was found on tug Maone in Gulf of Piran. It was lifted on 3 March 2015 as bad weather prevented bomb's relocation.
 17 August 2014: A 250 kg bomb was found in Maribor.
 13 February 2015: Three 250 kg American bombs wre found in Drava river in Maribor. Bombs were not dangerous and were stored till disposal.
 19 July 2017: A 41-year-old man found a 227 kg American bomb in the surroundings of Vurberk and brought it home. The bomb deactivated on 25 July, two explosions occurred. Intervention was regarded as one of the hardest in Slovenian history. 400 people were evacuated in radius of 1 km.
 17 April 2018: A 285 kg bomb was found in Nova Gorica and stored till disposal.
 17 April 2018: A British incendiary bomb of unknown mass was found in Rošpoh, Maribor and detonated.
 26 October 2019: A 250 kg was found in Maribor and detonated on 31 October.
 27 October 2019: An aerial bomb of unknown mass was found while a railway was undergoing reconstruction in Maribor.
 3 November 2019: A 500 kg bomb was deactivated in Maribor. There's still about 200 bombs left in Maribor.
 11 January 2022: A 250 kg was found in Maribor and deactivated on 16 January.
 14 May 2022: A 200 kg bomb was found in the vicinity of Pragersko railway station and stored till disposal.

See also
 Unexploded ordnance

References

Aftermath of World War II
Bomb disposal
Emergency management in Germany
Emergency management in Poland
Emergency management in the United Kingdom